Geeste is a railway station located in the municipality Geeste, Lower Saxony, Germany, in the Ortsteil Osterbrock. The station was opened in 1856 and is located on the Emsland line (Rheine - Norddeich). The train services are operated by WestfalenBahn.

Train services
The station is served by the following service(s):

Regional services  Emden - Leer - Lingen - Rheine - Münster

References

Railway stations in Lower Saxony
Railway stations in Germany opened in 1856